A back garden is a residential garden located at the rear of a property, on the other side of the house from the front garden.  Such gardens have a special place in English suburban and gardening culture.

Overview
A back garden arises when the main building divides the surrounding gardens into two.  This happens especially in the high density housing of British cities and towns.  A semi-detached house typical of the British suburbs of the 20th century will have front gardens which face the road and provide access.  The back gardens in such cases will be more secluded and access will typically be via the dwelling or by a path around the side. A front garden is a formal and semi-public space and so subject to the constraints of convention and law.  However, the back garden is more private and casual, and so can be put to more purposes.

If the housing is terraced, then no side path is possible and access may be provided by an alley which runs behind the rear of the terrace. While buildings opening directly onto a street may not have a front garden, most will have some space at the back, however small; the exception being back-to-back houses found in northern industrial towns in England such as Leeds, but now mostly demolished. A private back yard with a "privy" (toilet) was a defining feature of the byelaw terraced house, a type of dwelling built to comply with the Public Health Act 1875.

Number and size
In Britain there are over 10 million back gardens.  British planning require minimum distances between the rear faces of adjacent dwellings and so there is usually space for a back garden of some sort.  In other countries, such as Australia, this does not apply and preference for buildings with a large footprint has tended to squeeze out the space at the rear.

Usage
Because of weather constraints, it is usual to use a garden more in the summer than in the winter, although some usages are traditional, such as for a bonfire on Bonfire Night, 5 November.  Similarly, daytime usage is more common than nighttime.

Functionally, it may be used for:

 Growing food
 Playing games
 Relaxing and sunbathing
 Raising plants
 Housing pets
 Drying clothes
 Making a compost heap
 Hobbies
 Locating a greenhouse, conservatory, shed, workshop, outhouse, or garage (if access to  a road is possible)
 Partying
 Wildlife refuge 
 Safe area for children
 Location of an air raid shelter such as the Anderson shelter of World War II

In fact, its functional and recreational use is so varied, that it cannot be easily categorised. Many of the freedoms of the use of the back garden come from the restrictions, social or legal of what are not done in the front.

Usually, clothes are not dried, vegetables are not grown, and sunbathing is not carried out in a front garden. All these can happen in the privacy of the back garden.

Traditionally, people treat a back garden as private to themselves, and not those they are neighbours to. The social etiquette of how one can greet and interact one's neighbours may be complex and defined by many informal social rules.

In some areas, talking to one's neighbours over the back wall (the side wall following the property boundary line) is usual, and is a welcome form of neighbourliness, while in other places it is not.

See also

 Backyard
 List of garden types

References

Types of garden